The La Reserva de Sotogrande Invitational is a professional golf tournament on the Ladies European Tour, first played in 2019. 

The tournament is played in Spain at La Reserva Club de Sotogrande, southwest of Marbella on Costa del Sol. It was the first Ladies European Tour event held in Europe in the 2019 season.

Winners

References

External links

Ladies European Tour
La Reserva Club de Sotogrande

La Reserva de Sotogrande Invitational
Golf tournaments in Spain